Fujin may refer to:

Fujin, Heilongjiang, city in Heilongjiang, China
Fūjin, Japanese god of the wind 
Fujin (Final Fantasy VIII), a character in the game Final Fantasy VIII
Fujin, fictional character in the Mortal Kombat fighting game series
Fujin Road (Shanghai Metro), station on the Shanghai Metro Line 1
Fujin (headgear), a Chinese men's traditional headgear